Carl Anthony Payne II (born May 24, 1969) is an American actor. He is known for his roles as Cole Brown on the FOX sitcom Martin and Walter "Cockroach" Bradley on the NBC sitcom The Cosby Show, Carl on Rock Me Baby (TV series), Curtis on the sitcom George Lopez (2002–2003), and as Myles Wilson on Tyler Perry's Young Dylan.

Early life
Payne studied acting at the First All Children's Theater, an off-Broadway repertory theatre company. He graduated from Fiorello H. LaGuardia High School of Music & Art and Performing Arts in New York and Howard University.

Acting career
Carl Payne is known for his role as Cole Brown on the FOX sitcom Martin and his recurring role as Theo Huxtable's best friend Cockroach on the NBC sitcom The Cosby Show.

Payne played Reynaldo St. James on the BET series The Game. He directed and produced music videos, web series and short films, all while continuing to tour the country as a stand up comic. He even starred in the series For Richer or For Poorer, whose stars were LeToya Luckett and Rockmond Dunbar.

Payne also played an FBI agent, turned FCC field agent, on The Rickey Smiley Show.

Filmography

Film and TV movies

Television

Music video appearances
 Whodini - "Growing Up" (1986)
 Bobby Brown - "Girl Next Door" (1987)             
 Mint Condition - "Walk On" (2011)

References

External links

1969 births
Living people
American male film actors
American male television actors
African-American male actors
Howard University alumni
People from Harlem
21st-century African-American people
20th-century African-American people